The Winterberg bobsleigh, luge, and skeleton track is a bobsleigh, luge, and skeleton track located in Winterberg, Germany. It is the only track of its kind in the world with a turn that has corporate sponsorship with turn seven being sponsored by Veltins, a German brewery which has its headquarters located in neighboring Meschede.

History
Completed in 1977, the track underwent a redesign of its start house area where the women's luge start house was moved from before turn four to near the men's luge start house prior to turn one in 2006. This was done under the auspices of the International Bobsleigh and Tobogganing Federation (FIBT) and the International Luge Federation (FIL) and included a completely covered sled storage area, new changing rooms, and facilities for coaches and officials. The women's singles luge start house was integrated near the men's singles luge start house during the construction. The track hosted the first two-woman bobsleigh world championships in 2000.

Statistics

The venue includes a maximum grade of 15% and an average grade of 9.8%

Turns 4–6, 8–10 and 14 have no names listed in the track diagram.

Championships hosted
FIBT World Championships: 1995 (bobsleigh), 2000 (women's bobsleigh), 2003 (women's bobsleigh),  2015 (bobsleigh and skeleton) 
FIL European Luge Championships: 1982, 1992, 2000, 2006
FIL World Luge Championships: 1989, 1991, 2019

References

External links
BSD-portal.de track profile 
FIBT track profile - Click on video to ride down the track. Men's and women's singles luge will intersect with the bobsleigh and skeleton part of the track prior to turn one while men's doubles luge will intersect with the track prior to turn four.
FIL-Luge track profile
Official website 

Bobsleigh, luge, and skeleton tracks in Germany
Sports venues in North Rhine-Westphalia
Hochsauerlandkreis